Zgraja (Kunraczyc), a variant of the Janina coat of arms, is a Polish coat of arms. It was used by several szlachta (noble) families under the Polish–Lithuanian Commonwealth.

History

Blazon

Crest: three ostrich plumes

Notable bearers

Notable bearers of this coat of arms have included:

See also

 Polish heraldry
 Heraldry
 Coat of arms
 Ornatowski.com
 Dynastic Genealogy

Zgraja